Maya Grigoryevna Bulgakova (19 May 19327 October 1994) was a Soviet and Russian actress. She was one of the People's Artist of the RSFSR (1976).

Biography
Bulgakova was born on 19 May 1932 in the village of Buki (now the Kyiv Oblast, Ukraine). In 1941 the Bulgakov family moved to Kramatorsk, to this place they later returned from evacuation. In Kramatorsk, Bulgakova successfully graduated from high school and decided after graduation to become an actress. In 1955, Bulgakova graduated from VGIK (actor's workshop of Olga Pyzhova and Boris Bibikov) and started working in the National Film Actors' Theatre. She made her debut film in Grigori Roshal's The Libertine. Bulgakova began to sing on stage with the Utesov orchestra and won a prize at the 1957 World Festival of Youth and Students in Moscow. The actress has become the first in the USSR to perform on the stage the songs of Edith Piaf.

After a decade of inactivity episodic roles, her first major work were in Wings. After that. Bulgakova began to have a high output of small rolls in film and episodes.

Bulgakova first married cinematographer Anatoly Nitochkin, and then had a second marriage with Aleksey Gabrilovich, the son of the prominent screenwriter Yevgeny Gabrilovich. The couple raised two daughters. One of them, Maria Gabrilovich, later became an actress. In the 1970s Bulgakova remarried to the Austrian communist Peter Dobias (1937–1994).

Death
On 1 October 1994 Bulgakova and Lyubov Sokolova were in a car accident while on their way to a concert. The driver died at the scene; Bulgakova went into intensive care. Sokolova was released after a few weeks but Bulgakova died a few days later without regaining consciousness. Shortly before the accident, her husband died. A year later, her second husband Alexey Gabrilovich died.

Filmography
Resurrection (1960)
Chronicle of Flaming Years (1961)
An Easy Life (1964)
Wings (1966)
No Path Through Fire (1968)
Crime and Punishment (1970)
Trial on the Road (1971)
Yegor Bulychyov and Others (1971)
For the Rest of His Life (1975)
The Adventures of the Elektronic (1979)
The Youth of Peter the Great (1980)
Farewell (1983)
The Ballad of the Valiant Knight Ivanhoe (1983)
Stalin's Funeral (1990)
Terminal Velocity (1994)

References

External links
 

Road incident deaths in Russia
1932 births
1994 deaths
Russian film actresses
Russian stage actresses
Soviet film actresses
Soviet stage actresses
20th-century Russian actresses
People's Artists of the RSFSR
Gerasimov Institute of Cinematography alumni